Clach an Trushal (translated to English "Stone of Compassion") is said to be the tallest standing stone in Scotland. The stone is sited in the village of Ballantrushal on the west side of Lewis. Local legend says that it marks the site of a great battle, the last to be fought between the feuding clans of the Macaulays and Morrisons. However it is actually the solitary upright stone remaining from a stone circle built about 5,000 years ago. It occupied a place within the circle, although its placement was not central. The second last standing stone was removed in 1914, and used as a lintel.

From the base the stone circle at Steinacleit archaeological site is clearly visible to the north east.

References

External links
 

Archaeological sites in the Outer Hebrides
Macaulay family of Lewis
Megalithic monuments in Scotland
Scheduled monuments in Scotland
Buildings and structures in the Isle of Lewis